Astrit Patozi (born 22 July 1964 in Kavajë) is an Albanian politician and former member of the Assembly of the Republic of Albania. As one of the closest associates of former prime minister Sali Berisha, he served as deputy leader of the Democratic Party and also as head of its parliamentary group. On 23 April 2019, he became the coordinator of the newly born political party on the center-right of the Albanian political scene, Democratic Conviction.

Career as a journalist
 1992-1995: Worked at the Albanian Telegraphic Agency and later Newspaper "Rilindja" und "olti".
 1995-1997: Editor-in-chief of Newspaper "Albania".
 1997-2005: Editor-in-chief of Newspaper "Rilindja Demokratike".

Career as a politician
 1997–present : Member of the democratic Party's National Council.
 2002–present : Member of the Democratic Party's Directorate.
 2005-2007: Member of the Foreign Affairs Commission.
 2006: Commission Head for the inquiry to prosecute Theodori Sollaku, then Albania's Prosecutor General.
 2007-2009: Head of the Democratic Party's Parliamentary Group.
 2019- continuing coordinator of Democratic Conviction Party of Albania

References

Parliament members from Kavajë
Democratic Party of Albania politicians
Political party leaders of Albania
Members of the Parliament of Albania
Living people
1964 births
Albanian journalists
21st-century Albanian politicians